Conquest of Oran may refer to:
Spanish conquest of Oran (1509)
Spanish conquest of Oran (1732)